The 1914 Giro d'Italia was the sixth edition of the Giro d'Italia, one of cycling's Grand Tours. The field consisted of 81 riders, and eight riders finished the race.

By rider

By nationality

References

1914 Giro d'Italia
1914